Adolf Wörmann was a West German bobsledder who competed during the early 1960s. He won a bronze medal in the two-man event at the 1962 FIBT World Championships in Garmisch-Partenkirchen.

References
Bobsleigh two-man world championship medalists since 1931

German male bobsledders
Possibly living people
Year of birth missing